The third season of Ghost Whisperer, an American television series created by John Gray, commenced airing in the United States on September 28, 2007, concluded May 16, 2008, and was originally intended to consist of 22 episodes. However, due to the Writer's Strike, it was shortened to 18 episodes. The series follows the life of Melinda Gordon (Jennifer Love Hewitt), who has the ability to see and communicate with ghosts. While trying to live as normal a life as possible—she is married and owns an antique store—Melinda helps earthbound spirits resolve their problems and cross over into the Light, or the spirit world. Her tasks are difficult and at times she struggles with people who push her away and disbelieve her ability. In addition, the ghosts are mysterious and sometimes menacing in the beginning and Melinda must use the clues available to her to understand the spirit's needs and help them.

Ghost Whisperer'''s third season aired in the United States (U.S.) on Fridays at 8:00 pm ET on CBS, a terrestrial television network, where it received an average of 8.67 million viewers per episode.

This was the final season to be overseen by John Gray (he would be credited as a consultant on seasons four and five, although he continued to write and direct episodes).

 Plot 
In the third season, Melinda searches in her family history for answers as she gets closer to learning the secret of her gift, her childhood, and her estranged father. She soon finds out that Gabriel is her half-brother. Melinda finds a series of tunnels which lead to a town buried deep below Grandview, which houses dozens of ghosts.(The tunnel situation is never solved) She soon has dreams about a man in a mask coming to her in her sleep, and believes this is an event from her childhood.

At the end of the season, Tom Gordon (played by Martin Donovan) appears in Grandview alive with Gabriel. It is revealed the man in the mask is Paul Eastman, and Melinda's biological father (Melinda awoke Paul's ghost when searching in the tunnels). In disbelief, Melinda goes with Tom to her childhood home and when they arrive inside, Tom tells her the truth. When she was a child, Tom fell in love with Melinda's mother, Beth, while Paul was in prison. When Paul escaped from prison after a fire and returned home, Tom killed him in order to keep him from Beth and buried him in their basement. When he heard that Melinda was slowly uncovering the evidence, he had to return to Grandview. Tom tries to kill Melinda, but she is saved when Paul's ghost possesses Tom and throws him down a flight of stairs, killing him. The next day, Melinda and her friends meet in the town square. Melinda invites her mother, and the two say goodbye to Paul as he goes into the Light.

 Development Ghost Whisperer is based on the work of "Spirit Communicator" James Van Praagh, who is co-executive producer and regularly updates a blog about the show through LivingTV. The stories are also said to be based in part on the work of "Spirit Communicator" Mary Ann Winkowski. Development of the show dates back to at least two years before its premiere.

The show was produced by Sander/Moses Productions in association with CBS Television Studios (originally Paramount Network Television in season one and ABC Studios (originally Touchstone Television in the first two seasons) and CBS Paramount Network Television in seasons two and three).

The show was filmed on the Universal Studios back lot in Los Angeles. One area on the lot is Courthouse Square from the Back to the Future trilogy, though it has been drastically modified to depict Grandview. For example, the clock tower in Back to the Future'' has been completely covered up. Cast and crew members believe that the set gets visits from real spirits.

Sound effects were completed at Smart Post Sound. Visual effects for the pilot and some season one episodes were completed at Flash Film Works. Visual effects for nearly the entire series were created at Eden FX.

Creator John Gray grew up in Brooklyn, New York, which is not far from Grandview-On-Hudson, west of the Hudson River. Piermont is often referenced in episodes as the neighboring town, which is accurate to real life as Grandview-On-Hudson is actually located just north of Piermont. Professor Rick Payne worked in the fictional "Rockland University," and perhaps not coincidentally, the actual Grandview, New York is a village located in Rockland County, New York.

Cast 

 Jennifer Love Hewitt as Melinda Gordon (18 episodes)
 David Conrad as Jim Clancy (18 episodes)
 Camryn Manheim as Delia Banks (18 episodes)
 Jay Mohr as Rick Payne (14 episodes)
 Christoph Sanders as Ned Banks (4 episodes)

Episodes

References 

General references 
 
 
 

2008 American television seasons
2007 American television seasons
3